Sara Spencer Washington (June 6, 1889 – March 23, 1953) was the founder of Apex News and Hair Company and was honored at the 1939 New York World's Fair as one of the "Most Distinguished Businesswomen" for her Apex empire of beauty company, schools, and products.  Washington gave back to her community, whether founding a nursing home called Apex Rest in Atlantic City, New Jersey or the Apex Golf Club, one of the first African-American owned golf courses in the nation.

Early life
Sara Spencer Washington was born in Beckley, West Virginia on June 6, 1889 to Joshua and Ellen Douglass Phillips. As a girl, she attended public schools in the Beckley area before going to the Lincoln Preparatory School in Philadelphia, Pennsylvania and Norfolk Mission College in Norfolk, Virginia. Before starting her beauty industry, Washington studied advanced chemistry at Columbia University.

In 1905, Washington began her career as a dressmaker, a profession she continued until 1913. That year, she opened her own small hairdresser shop in Atlantic City, New Jersey, despite the fact that her parents wanted her to become a school teacher.

Career 
In 1919, Washington founded the Apex News and Hair Company in Atlantic City, New Jersey and began her career as a cosmetics entrepreneur. She experimented with a variety of cosmetic products, targeting the market of African American women. While Washington started with a one-room beauty shop, she was able to grow her business into an empire by working in her beauty salon during the day and canvassing for her cosmetic products at night.

The Apex Beauty Products Company encompassed a variety of products, from pressing oils, hot combs, and pomades for hair to perfumes, beauty creams, and lipsticks. Washington recognized the value in the beauty industry and considered it one of the best professions to enter. She is known for saying, "As long as there are women in the world, there will be beauty establishments."

Indeed, the demand that Washington recognized surfaced in the United States. The Apex empire included eleven different beauty schools in the United States, with schools in foreign countries that specialized in teaching with her products. It is estimated that Washington's company employed nearly five hundred people in her stores across the nation, in addition to the estimated forty-five thousand sales agents who canvassed Apex beauty products as Washington had in her early days.

While Washington did not pioneer the beauty industry, she emerged into the beauty market after the world had suffered from World War I and the Great Depression. She has been celebrated for coining the slogan, "Now is the time to plan your future by learning a depression-proof business." While Washington's company started as a one-room beauty shop, it is estimated to have been worth nearly half-a-million dollars by the mid-1940s.

Legacy 
In 1939, Washington was recognized for her company at the 1939 New York World's Fair. Washington's empire had expanded from the Apex Beauty Products Company to the Apex News and Hair Company, the Apex Publishing Company, which published the Apex News for Washington's estheticians and sales agents, Apex Laboratories which created her cosmetics and products, Apex Drug Company, and Apex Beauty Colleges.

Washington's international recognition from her 1939 award enhanced both her business empire and the status of African American women, as her business empire had enabled her to become one of America's first black millionaires. Washington's success enabled her to give back to her community. She contributed twenty acres of farm land as a campsite for African American youth, and gave an endowment of a home for girls, supporting the educational elements of the National Youth Administration program.
There is a historical marker in Atlantic City in the neighborhood where Madame Washington lived and operated Apex.

One of the most successful and long-standing schools was The Apex College of Beauty in Philadelphia, remaining progressive for decades. As of the 1980s, it became the country’s oldest black institution of beauty technology.

See also

References 

1889 births
1953 deaths
19th-century American women
20th-century American businesspeople
African-American company founders
African-American women in business
American company founders
American women company founders
American cosmetics businesspeople
American hairdressers
Columbia Graduate School of Arts and Sciences alumni
People from Atlantic City, New Jersey
Businesspeople from Beckley, West Virginia
American tailors
Place of death missing
20th-century American businesswomen
20th-century African-American women
20th-century African-American people